John Holmes Jackson (March 21, 1871 – December 14, 1944) was an American politician who served as the 24th and 26th Mayor of Burlington, Vermont. His initial narrow ten vote victory in 1917 against incumbent Albert S. Drew is the closest mayoral election in Burlington's history, although Clarence H. Beecher's 1927 victory was decreased from 89 votes to 8 votes by a Supreme Court ruling in 1929, and wasn't matched until Bernie Sanders won the 1981 mayoral election by ten votes after a recount.

Life
Jackson was born in Montreal, Canada and moved to Vermont with family which later became a prominent Vermont political family which included his brothers, Horatio Nelson Jackson and Hollister Jackson. Following his graduation from the Philadelphia Dental College he practiced dentistry in Barre, Vermont until 1896 when he moved to Burlington, Vermont. In 1894 Jackson was put on trial for interfering with an officer while he was beating a criminal and was found not guilty.

In 1917, Jackson defeated the incumbent Republican Albert S. Drew in the Burlington mayoral election by ten votes with 1,416 votes to 1,406 votes. In 1919 Jackson won reelection against Harris R. Watkins with 2,149 votes to 1,930 votes. During his tenure in 1918 he handled the Spanish flu outbreak in the city and motorized the fire department and in 1919 he became one of the first Vermonters and politicians to ride in a seaplane. In 1920, Jackson was elected to represent Burlington in the Vermont House of Representatives and he served one term, 1921 to 1923. In 1921 he was elected to a third term after defeating William B. McKillip with 1,941 votes to 1,476 votes. In 1922 he was the Democratic nominee for governor, but was defeated in a landslide by Redfield Proctor Jr. with 51,104 votes to 17,059 votes. In 1923 he faced no opposition for reelection as mayor, with both the Democratic and Republican city committees choosing to endorse him.

At the 1924 Democratic National Convention, Jackson was a delegate and on the 39th ballot received one vote for president.  John W. Davis won the nomination on the 103rd ballot, and lost the general election to incumbent Republican Calvin Coolidge.

On April 1, 1929, Jackson returned to the mayoralty.  Shortly after taking office he shut down the city Convention Bureau, which was unable to account for all of the $5,000 of city funds it spent to host the 1928 New England Firemen's Convention. After winning reelection he was nominated for lieutenant governor in 1930; he lost, as did all statewide Democratic candidates during this era, but received two percent more of the vote than Park Pollard, his party's nominee for governor. In the 1930 House election he endorsed former Burlington municipal court judge Joseph A. McNamara in his unsuccessful run. Jackson declined to run for reelection and endorsed former mayor James Edmund Burke.  Burke won, and on April 3, 1933 he succeeded Jackson as mayor.

In 1936, Jackson was a delegate to the state Democratic convention.  He also attended the national convention as a supporter of Franklin D. Roosevelt, who was renominated by acclimation. During World War II, Jackson, James J. Carney, and Phillips M. Bell were appointed by Governor William Wills to serve as Burlington's rationing board.

Personal life
On June 4, 1901, Jackson married Caroline Deming Smalley, the granddaughter of David Allen Smalley, who served as judge of the United States District Court for the District of Vermont and chairman of the Democratic National Committee.  They were the parents of a son, Bradley Smalley Jackson. During his career as mayor he appointed Caroline to multiple positions including the library board of commissioners. On December 14, 1944, Jackson died at the Bishop DeGoesbriand Hospital (later merged with the University of Vermont Medical Center).  He was buried at Lakeview Cemetery in Burlington.

Electoral history

References

1871 births
1944 deaths
Canadian emigrants to the United States
American dentists
Mayors of Burlington, Vermont
Democratic Party members of the Vermont House of Representatives
Politicians from Montreal
20th-century American politicians
Burials at Lakeview Cemetery (Burlington, Vermont)